The 2023 MEAC men's basketball tournament is the postseason men's basketball tournament for the 2022–23 season in the Mid-Eastern Athletic Conference (MEAC). The tournament will take place during March 8–11, 2023. The tournament winner will receive the conference's automatic invitation to the 2023 NCAA Division I men's basketball tournament.

Seeds 
All 8 teams are eligible and will be seeded by record within the conference, with a tiebreaker system to seed teams with identical conference records.

Schedule

Bracket 

* denotes overtime period

References 

Tournament
MEAC men's basketball tournament
College basketball tournaments in Virginia
Basketball competitions in Norfolk, Virginia
MEAC men's basketball tournament
MEAC men's basketball tournament